The César Award for Most Promising Actress is one of the César Awards, presented annually by the Académie des Arts et Techniques du Cinéma to recognize the outstanding breakthrough performance of a young actress who has worked within the French film industry during the year preceding the ceremony. Nominees and winner are selected via a run-off voting by all the members of the Académie, within a group of 16 actresses previously shortlisted by the Révélations Committee.

In English, the award is variously referred to as "Breakthrough performance, actress" or "Newcomer, female".

Winners and nominees
Following the AATC's practice, the films below are listed by year of ceremony, which corresponds to the year following the film's year of release. For example, the César Award for Most Promising Actress of 2010 was awarded on 27 February 2010 for a performance in a film released between 1 January 2009 and 31 December 2009.

As with the other César awards, actresses are selected via a two-round vote: first round to choose the nominees, second round to designate the winner. All the members of the Académie, without regard to their branch, are eligible to vote on both rounds. But in order to "facilitate" the nomination vote, the Révélations Committee of the Académie, consisting of casting directors, establishes and proposes a list of a maximum of 16 actresses. However, this list is non-binding and Académie members are free to vote for an actress who has not been shortlisted. Initially set to four, the number of nominees was expanded to five in 1990.

Winners are listed first in bold, followed by the other nominees.

1980s

1990s

2000s

2010s

2020s

Révélations
Each year, the Academy's Governing Board and the Révélations Committee (made up of casting directors working in French film productions) propose a list of a maximum of 16 young actresses ("Révélations des César") to facilitate the voting for the "Most Promising Actress" award. Since 2007, all young actresses who have worked on French feature-length films or primarily French-language productions are eligible for the list. However, beginning from 2013, an actress cannot qualify for the list more than twice. The "Révélations" are also featured in a short film directed by an artist appointed by the Academy yearly. The short film, unveiled at a gala dinner which is organised in honour of the "Révélations", is also later screened at select cinemas in France.

Nominees of the César Award for Most Promising Actress are highlighted in boldface.

2000s

2007

 Morjana Alaoui – Marock
 Leïla Bekhti – Bad Faith (Mauvaise Foi)
 Lizzie Brochere – One to Another (Chacun sa nuit)
 Sophie Cattani – Charlie Says (Selon Charlie)
 Maroussia Dubreuil – The Exterminating Angels (Les Anges exterminateurs)
 Déborah François – The Page Turner (La Tourneuse de pages)
 Marina Hands – Lady Chatterley
 Hande Kodja – Murderers (Meurtrières)
 Mélanie Laurent – Don't Worry, I'm Fine (Je vais bien ne t'en fais pas)
 Adélaïde Leroux – Flanders (Flandres)
 Aïssa Maiga – Bamako
 Maïwenn – Pardonnez-moi
 Joséphine de Meaux – Those Happy Days (Nos jours heureux)
 Clémence Poésy – Le Grand Meaulnes
 Sophie Quinton – April in Love (Avril)
 Céline Sallette – Murderers (Meurtrières)

2008

 Louise Blachère – Water Lilies (Naissance des pieuvres)
 Chloé Coulloud – La Tête de maman
 Audrey Dana – Roman de Gare
 Judith Davis – Jacquou le Croquant
 Anaïs Demoustier – L'Année suivante
 Émilie de Preissac – Regarde-moi
 Adèle Haenel – Water Lilies (Naissance des pieuvres)
 Hafsia Herzi – The Secret of the Grain (La Graine et le Mulet)
 Clotilde Hesme – Love Songs (Les Chansons d'amour)
 Yeelem Jappain – Those Who Remain (Ceux qui restent)
 Marie Kremer – Beneath the Rooftops of Paris (Les Toits de Paris)
 Clémence Poésy – Sans moi
 Constance Rousseau – All Is Forgiven (Tout est pardonné)
 Stéphanie Sokolinski – On the Ropes (Dans les cordes)
 Louise Szpindel – On the Ropes (Dans les cordes)
 Christa Theret – Et toi, t'es sur qui?

2009

 Nora Arnezeder – Paris 36 (Faubourg 36)
 Leïla Bekhti – Dolls and Angels (Des poupées et des anges)
 Mélanie Bernier – Passe-passe
 Marilou Berry – Vilaine
 Olympe Borval – Le Chant des mariées
 Louise Bourgoin – The Girl from Monaco (La Fille de Monaco)
 Lizzie Brocheré – Le Chant des mariées 
 Judith Chemla – Versailles
 Anaïs Demoustier – Les Grandes Personnes
 Déborah François – The First Day of the Rest of Your Life (Le premier jour du reste de ta vie)
 Juliette Lamboley – Daddy Cool (15 ans et demi)
 Adélaïde Leroux – Home 
 Clémentine Poidatz – Frontier of the Dawn (La Frontière de l'aube)
 Léa Seydoux – The Beautiful Person (La Belle Personne)
 Salomé Stévenin – Like a Star Shining in the Night (Comme une étoile dans la nuit)
 Fanny Valette – Welcome Home (Sur ta joue ennemie)

2010s

2010

 Marie-Julie Baup – Micmacs (Micmacs à tire-larigot)
 Astrid Berges Frisbey – The Sea Wall (Un barrage contre le Pacifique)
 Agathe Bonitzer – Un chat un chat
 Sophie Cattani – I'm Glad My Mother Is Alive (Je suis heureux que ma mère soit vivante)
 Judith Davis – You Will Be Mine (Je te mangerais)
 Anaïs Demoustier – Sois sage
 Mati Diop – 35 Shots of Rum (35 rhums)
 Pauline Etienne – Silent Voice (Qu'un seul tienne et les autres suivront)
 Alice de Lencquesaing – Father of My Children (Le Père de mes enfants)
 Florence Loiret-Caille – Je l'aimais
 Sara Martins – Mensch
 Lola Naymark – The Army of Crime (L'Armée du crime)
 Vimala Pons – Bitter Victory (La Sainte Victoire)
 Soko – In the Beginning (À l'origine)
 Christa Theret – LOL (Laughing Out Loud)
 Mélanie Thierry – One for the Road (Le Dernier pour la route)

2011

 Raphaëlle Agogué – The Round Up (La Rafle)
 Clara Augarde – Love Like Poison (Un poison violent)
 Leïla Bekhti – Tout ce qui brille
 Judith Chemla – De vrais mensonges
 Vanessa David – Sweet Valentine
 Anaïs Demoustier – Living on Love Alone (D'amour et d'eau fraîche)
 Adèle Exarchopoulos – Turk's Head (Tête de turc)
 Ana Girardot – Lights Out (Simon Werner a disparu...)
 Annabelle Hettmann – The Sentiment of the Flesh (Le Sentiment de la chair)
 Audrey Lamy – Tout ce qui brille
 Elise Lhomeau – Young Girls in Black (Des filles en noir)
 Nina Meurisse – Accomplices (Complices)
 Veronika Novak – My Father's Guests
 Agathe Schlencker – Belle Épine
 Léa Seydoux – Belle Épine
 Yahima Torres – Black Venus (Vénus noire)

2012

 Naidra Ayadi – Polisse
 Anne Azoulay – Léa
 Alice Barnole – House of Tolerance (L'Apollonide : Souvenirs de la maison close)
 Astrid Bergès-Frisbey – The Well-Digger's Daughter (La Fille du puisatier)
 Lola Créton – Goodbye First Love (Un amour de jeunesse)
 Marie Denarnaud – The Adopted (Les Adoptés)
 Amandine Dewasmes – All Our Desires (Toutes nos envies)
 Golshifteh Farahani – Si tu meurs, je te tue
 Adèle Haenel – House of Tolerance (L'Apollonide : Souvenirs de la maison close)
 Clotilde Hesme – Angel & Tony (Angèle et Tony)
 Joséphine Japy – The Monk (Le Moine)
 Céline Sallette – House of Tolerance (L'Apollonide : Souvenirs de la maison close)
 Christa Théret – Twiggy (La Brindille)
 Alison Wheeler – Mon père est femme de ménage
 Iliana Zabeth – House of Tolerance (L'Apollonide : Souvenirs de la maison close)

2013

 Laurence Arné – Bowling
 Alice Belaïdi – Porn in the Hood (Les Kaïra)
 Agathe Bonitzer – A Bottle in the Gaza Sea  (Une bouteille à la mer)
 Lola Créton – Something in the Air (Après mai)
 Alice de Lencquesaing – Au galop
 Lola Dewaere – Mince alors!
 Arta Dobroshi – Three Worlds (Trois mondes)
 Julia Faure – Camille Rewinds (Camille redouble)
 India Hair – Camille Rewinds (Camille redouble)
 Izïa Higelin – Bad Girl (Mauvaise Fille)
 Sarah Le Picard – Alyah 
 Sofiia Manousha – Le noir (te) vous va si bien
 Noémie Merlant – L'Orpheline avec en plus un bras en moins
 Alice Pol – A Perfect Plan (Un plan parfait)
 Clara Ponsot – Bye Bye Blondie
 Camille Rutherford – Low Life

2014

 Margot Bancilhon – Les Petits Princes
 Flore Bonaventura – Chinese Puzzle (Casse-tête chinois)
 Pauline Burlet – The Past (Le Passé)
 Lou de Laâge – Jappeloup
 Laetitia Dosch – Age of Panic (La Bataille de Solférino)
 Pauline Etienne – The Nun (La Religieuse)
 Adèle Exarchopoulos – Blue Is the Warmest Colour (La Vie d'Adèle – Chapitres 1 & 2)
 Golshifteh Farahani – The Patience Stone (Syngué sabour. Pierre de patience)
 Esther Garrel – Youth (Jeunesse)
 Ariane Labed – A Place on Earth (Une place sur la terre)
 Charlotte Le Bon – The Marchers (La Marche)
 Chloé Lecerf – Vandal
 Anamaria Marinca – Un nuage dans un verre d'eau
 Pauline Parigot – Les Lendemains
 Vimala Pons – La Fille du 14 juillet
 Marine Vacth – Young & Beautiful (Jeune & jolie)

2015

 Soumaye Bocoum – Papa Was Not a Rolling Stone
 Armande Boulanger – La Pièce manquante 
 Lolita Chammah – Gaby Baby Doll
 Lou de Laâge – Respire
 Louane Emera – La Famille Bélier
 Alice Isaaz – La Crème de la crème
 Joséphine Japy – Respire
 Ariane Labed – Fidelio, Alice's Odyssey (Fidelio, l'odyssée d'Alice)
 Sofia Lesaffre – Les Trois Frères : Le Retour 
 Mélodie Richard – Métamorphoses
 Solène Rigot – Tonnerre
 Ariana Rivoire – Marie's Story (Marie Heurtin)
 Anna Sigalevitch – Loup-Garou
 Philippine Stindel – Mercuriales
 Assa Sylla – Girlhood (Bande de filles)
 Karidja Touré – Girlhood (Bande de filles)

2016

 Mathilde Bisson – Au plus près du Soleil
 Camille Cottin – Connasse, Princesse des cœurs
 Lucie Debay – Melody
 Sara Giraudeau – Les Bêtises
 Zita Hanrot – Fatima
 Stacy Martin – Taj Mahal
 Freya Mavor – The Lady in the Car with Glasses and a Gun (La Dame dans l'auto avec des lunettes et un fusil)
 Baya Medhaffar – As I Open My Eyes (À peine j'ouvre les yeux)
 Lena Paugam – In the Shadow of Women (L'Ombre des femmes)
 Diane Rouxel – Standing Tall (La Tête haute)
 Lou Roy-Lecollinet – My Golden Days (Trois souvenirs de ma jeunesse)
 Georgia Scalliet – L'Odeur de la mandarine
 Noémie Schmidt – The Student and Mister Henri (L'Étudiante et Monsieur Henri)
 Pauline Serieys – Une famille à louer
 Sarah Suco – Discount
 Lily Taieb – My Golden Days (Trois souvenirs de ma jeunesse)
 Sophie Verbeeck – All About Them (À trois on y va)

2017

 Oulaya Amamra – Divines
 Naomi Amarger – Heaven Will Wait (Le Ciel attendra)
 Paula Beer – Frantz
 Galatéa Bellugi – Keeper
 Sigrid Bouaziz – Personal Shopper
 Lily-Rose Depp – The Dancer (La Danseuse)
 Eye Haïdara – Jailbirds (La Taularde)
 Liv Henneguier – Crache cœur
 Manal Issa – Parisienne (Peur de rien)
 Annabelle Lengronne – La Fine Équipe
 Marilyn Lima – Bang Gang (A Modern Love Story) (Bang Gang (une histoire d'amour moderne))
 Noémie Merlant – Heaven Will Wait (Le Ciel attendra)
 Raph – Slack Bay (Ma Loute)
 Salomé Richard – Baden Baden
 Ginger Romàn – The Stopover (Voir du pays)
 Julia Roy – Never Ever (À jamais)
 Anastasia Shevtsova – Polina (Polina, danser sa vie)

2018

 Noée Abita – Ava
 Sveva Alviti – Dalida
 Iris Bry – The Guardians (Les Gardiennes)
 Louise Chevillotte – Lover for a Day (L'Amant d'un jour)
 Adeline d'Hermy – Maryline
 Lætitia Dosch – Montparnasse Bienvenue (Jeune Femme)
 Lina El Arabi – A Wedding (Noces)
 Esther Garrel – Lover for a Day (L'Amant d'un jour)
 Ana Girardot – Back to Burgundy (Ce qui nous lie)
 Eye Haïdara – C'est la vie! (Le Sens de la fête)
 Alice Isaaz – Espèces menacées
 Camélia Jordana – Le Brio
 Lyna Khoudri – Les Bienheureux
 Garance Marillier – Raw (Grave)
 Daphné Patakia – Djam
 Paméla Ramos - Tous les rêves du monde
 Solène Rigot – Orphan (Orpheline)
 Ella Rumpf – Raw (Grave)

See also
Lumières Award for Most Promising Actress
Magritte Award for Most Promising Actress

References

External links 
  
 César Award for Most Promising Actress at AlloCiné
 

Most Promising Actress
 
Lists of award winners
Awards for young actors